John "Jackie" Powell was a rugby union player who represented South Africa 4 times, once as captain. At 19 years 260 days, he is one of the youngest ever players to have represented South Africa. He also played first-class cricket for Griqualand West.

Powell attended St. Andrew's College, Grahamstown in 1890.

References

External links
 
Van Lill's South African Sports Trivia
Springbok Rugby Hall of Fame
Cricinfo: John Powell

South African rugby union players
South Africa international rugby union players
South African cricketers
Griqualand West cricketers
1871 births
1955 deaths
Alumni of St. Andrew's College, Grahamstown
Rugby union players from Cape Town
Rugby union fly-halves
Griquas (rugby union) players